Péter Krekó (born 20 March 1980) is a Hungarian economist, political psychologist, political scientist, and professor. He currently serves as the Director of the Political Capital Institute, and as a senior external researcher for the Center for European Policy Analysis.

Early life and career 

Krekó was born on 20 March 1980 to Béla Krekó Jr. and Ildikó Kupa. His grandfather Béla Krekó was a mathematical economist. Currently, Péter Krekó is the supervisor of the Doctoral School of Psychology at Eötvös Loránd University. His areas of research include: conspiracy theories, fake, political populism and extremism, Russian soft power influence, and intergroup conflicts.

Notable works 
 Web of Science has published 10 studies. h-index 4. Average citations per item 7. Number of independent citations 68.
Péter Krekó. 32 Publications, 12,289 Reads, 245 Citations.
 Faragó Laura-Ferenczy-Nyúl Dávid- Kende-Anna-Krekó Péter-Gurály, Zoltán: Criminalization as a justification for violence against the homeless in Hungary. JOURNAL OF SOCIAL PSYCHOLOGY 161 Paper: OnlineFirst. 15 p. (2021) 
 Kende-Anna-Krekó Péter: Xenophobia, prejudice, and right-wing populism in East-Central Europe. CURRENT OPINION IN BEHAVIORAL SCIENCES 34 pp. 29–33. 5 p. (2020)
 Countering conspiracy theories and misinformation. In: Butter, M; Knight, P (szerk.) Routledge Handbook of Conspiracy Theories. Abingdon, Egyesült Királyság / Anglia : Routledge, (2020) p.
 Faragó-Laura-Kende, Anna-Krekó, Péter: We only Believe in News that We Doctored Ourselves: The Connection between Partisanship and Political Fake News. SOCIAL PSYCHOLOGY 51. 2 pp. 77–90. 14 p. (2020)
 Russia in Hungarian public opinion. In: Tóth István György (szerk.) Hungarian Social Report 2019.Budapest, Magyarország. Tárki Társadalomkutatási Intézet Zrt., (2019) pp. 358–371. 16 p.
 Krekó Péter-Molnár Csaba-Rácz András: Mystification and demystification of Putin’s Russia: Research summary: 26 p. (2019) Budapest. Political Capital Policy Research and Consulting Institute Kiadó.
 Faragó Laura-Kende, Anna-Krekó Péter: Justification of intergroup violence – the role of right-wing authoritarianism and propensity for radical action. DYNAMICS OF ASYMMETRIC CONFLICT: PATHWAYS TOWARD TERRORISM AND GENOCIDE 12. 2 pp. 113–128. 16 p. (2019)
 The relationship between populist attitudes and support for political violence in Hungary and Poland. Paper. (2018) 
 Mass Paranoia: The Social Psychology of Conspiracy Theories and False News. ; Budapest, Magyarország, Athenaeum Kiadó (2018), 350 p.
 Péter Krekó-Attila, Juhász: The Hungarian Far Right: Social Demand, Political Supply, and International Context. Stuttgart, Németország. Ibidem-Verlag (2017) 260 p.
 Conspiracy Theory as Collective Motivated Cognition. In: Bilewicz, M; Cichocka, A; Soral, W (szerk.) The Psychology of Conspiracy. London, Egyesült Királyság. Routledge. (2015) pp. 62–75., 8 p.

References 

People from Budapest
1980 births
Living people
Hungarian political scientists